Dmitry Valeryevich Belov (born 28 January 1980) is a former Russian professional association football player.

External links 
 

1980 births
Footballers from Tambov
Living people
Russian footballers
FC Spartak Tambov players
FC Lada-Tolyatti players
FC Vityaz Podolsk players
FC Slavyansk Slavyansk-na-Kubani players
Association football forwards
FC Orenburg players